The Ink Thief is a 1994 British children's TV show, shown on the ITV channel during their CITV segment. It starred Richard O'Brien and Toyah Willcox. The series was produced by Animus Entertainment for Tyne Tees Television.

Plot summary
The titular antagonist known only as the Ink Thief (O'Brien) steals the power of imagination by sucking the "ink" out of books and drawings. At the start of the show, brother and sister Jim and Sam stumble upon his gothic world filled with Oobs, Bumps, and other imaginary creatures. During the course of the show, the children's friendship is tested as Jim gets seduced by the Ink Thief, whereas Sam fights to stop him. Each episode is peppered with plot-specific songs, giving the show a musical feel.

Production
Illustrator Steve Hanson developed the first concept art for the show. Production Designer Murti Schofield says on his website: "It should be remembered that it was Steve’s brilliant concepts that got everybody fired up in the first place." The show was written by Paul Springer, who also authored a book based on the series.

Director Tony White described it as "very much a low-budget, no-time effort but it was successful on British Television, making No. 5 in the ratings" Some of the production crew, including White and Schofield, also acted in the show in small parts. The writer Paul Springer appeared in a larger role, as the character "Toddy", the Ink Thief's bumbling cat henchman. The series' various songs were composed by Adrian Lee. The show only lasted for one season, consisting of seven half-hour-long episodes.

Cast
Main cast:
Felicity Todd as Sam - An artistic girl who stumbles into the world of Bumps and fights to win back her brother from The Ink Thief's clutches.
Stefan Weclawek as Jim - A bright boy whose knowledge of science makes him vulnerable to being used by The Ink Thief.
Richard O'Brien as The Ink Thief - A muse-like creature who's supposed to inspire writers and artists, but he's gone rogue and consumes imagination to boost his own power. 
Joyce Springer as Miz Tiggle - A librarian who often speaks in confounding riddles, the good-natured Miz Tiggle is sister to the Ink Thief.
Gary Martin as Lorni Snoop - A floppy-eared bump who loves to Snoop but is frightened of his own shadow.
Toyah Willcox as Dog - A loyal friend to Miz Tiggle who strives to protect the library.
Richard Ridings as Aloysius - The Ink Thief's righthand man, a muscular rat.
Paul Springer as Toddy - A dimwitted cat who works for the Ink Thief.
Owain Thomas - Creaker
Kristen Wilkin - Thumper
Tamir Randall - Roll
Mary-Louise Clark - Shake Rattle/Storm

Appearing in five episodes or less:
Andy Andrews - Hot Air
James Barton - Sir Bumpalot/Mr Waverley
Tessa Crockett - Moonshooter 1/Messa Sloppit
Trevor Michael Georges - Rock
Catherine Jansen - Cheesey/Mrs. Waverley
Zoe Loyell Othen - Goosebump
Sally Owen - Loose Page/Big Balloonie
Dave Price - Previous Ink Thief
Talia Benni Randall - Moonshooter 2
Julia Righton - The Bumpess
Murti Schofield - Air Academy Bump/Shark
Tony White - Leonardo da Vinci

Episodes

References

External links

Britbox
Internet Archive - Novelization

1994 British television series debuts
1994 British television series endings
1990s British children's television series
ITV children's television shows
Television shows shot at Elstree Film Studios
1990s British television miniseries
Television series by ITV Studios
Television shows produced by Tyne Tees Television
English-language television shows
1990s British music television series